Nowice may refer to the following places in Poland:
Nowice, Lower Silesian Voivodeship (south-west Poland)
Nowice, West Pomeranian Voivodeship (north-west Poland)